Blida (Tamazight: Leblida) is a city in Algeria. It is the capital of Blida Province, and it is located about 45 km south-west of Algiers, the national capital. The name Blida, i.e. bulaydah, is a diminutive of the Arabic word belda, city.

Geography and natural features
Blida is known as the city of roses because of the large number of roses in its gardens.

The abundant water of this stream provides power for large corn mills and several factories, and also supplies the town with its numerous fountains and irrigated gardens. Within Blida is Chréa National Park, one of the largest national parks in the country and part of the Atlas Mountains. Blida is surrounded by a wall of considerable extent, pierced by six gates, and is further defended by Port Mimieh, crowning a steep hill on the left bank of the river.

The nearby Chiffa gorge is a habitat of the endangered Barbary macaque, Macaca sylvanus; the habitat is one of only a few locations where populations of the primate are found.

Climate
In Blida, there is a Mediterranean climate. In winter there is more rainfall than in summer. The Köppen-Geiger climate classification is Csa. About  of precipitation falls annually.

History

The present town, French in character, has well-built modern streets with many arcades, and numbers among its buildings several mosques and churches, extensive barracks and a large military hospital. The principal square, the place d'Armes, is surrounded by arcaded houses and shaded by trees. The center of a fertile district, and a post on one of the main routes in the country, Blida has a flourishing trade, chiefly in oranges and flour. The orange groves contain over 50,000 trees, and in April the air for miles round is laden with the scent of the orange blossoms. In the public gardens is a group of magnificent olive trees. The products of the neighboring cork trees and cedar groves are a source of revenue to the town. Sidi-Ahmed El-Kebir, Blida's founder, is buried in Sidi El-Kebir (an area named after him). He founded Blida in the 16th century.

The city occupies the site of a military station in the time of the Romans, but the present town appears to date from the 16th century, in which it was founded, according to Baedeker, by Moors. A mosque was built by order of Khair-ed-din Barbarossa, and under the Turks the town was of some importance. In 1825 it was nearly destroyed by an earthquake, but was speedily re-erected on a site about a mile distant from the ruins. It was intricately rebuilt of interconnecting alleyways and streets, and was made accessible through the existing six major gates. The gates were as follows: 
Bab Er-Rahba
Bab Ed-Zair
Bab El-Khouikha
Bab Es-Sebt
Bab Ez-Zaouia
Bab El-Kbour
Bab El-Kseb

Today those gates no longer exist, but their names are still in use by people in Blida as reference points to locate streets, places, schools and businesses.

In 1867, another earthquake damaged Blida.

Blida Province is home to a number of Berber-speaking tribes &towns. The Berbers of Blida are  known as  Djebailia and have been in the plains of Blida/Matija for thousands of years according to historians such as Ibn khaldoun. The tribes are Beni Salah(Ith salah)Beni Misrah(Ith Misra), Ghalia and many more. They speak Taqbaylit the language of the Kabyle which is the Berber language of blida close to the Kabyle varieties spoken east of Algiers Province, It's 95% identical and has traditionally been seen as an intermediate between Kabyle and the Chenoua language native to the north-eastern part of the country.

Notable locations 

 Stade Mustapha Tchaker in Blida is the current exclusive home stadium for the Algeria national football team. This has been the case since it was opened in 2002, Algeria have however also played many of their home games away from Tchaker throughout their history, both in friendly matches and for competitive tournaments.

 Al-Kawthar Mosque is located in the center of the city at the Bin Merah Square, known as the famous square of the Toot in Blida. The mosque is distinguished by its space as it attracts more than 12 thousand worshipers on religious occasions.
 Place Toute is located in the center of Blida located near Bab Es-Sebt, Al-Kawthar Mosque, and the old market. Tourists and locals can enjoy the many cafes, pastry shops, ice cream shops, and ither restaurants while their children play in the plaza.

Notable people

 Sidi-Ahmed El-Kebir (15th-16th Centry), Religious man, City Founder
 Mhamed Yazid (1923-2003), Politician
 Mahfoud Nahnah (1942-2003), Politician
  (1893-1976), Theologian
  (1941-1993), Politician
 Elissa Rhaïs, Novelist
 Edouard Nieuport (1875-1911), Aviation pioneer and manufacturer
 Mohammed Mazouni, Singer
 Mohamed El Touri, Comedian
 Mustapha Sellami, Football player
 Salah Aougrout, Comedian
 Bachir Selami, Filmographer
 Mustapha Benguergoura, Singer
 Farid Khodja, singer
 Rabah Driassa, Singer & Painter
 Baya, Artist
 Souhila Bel Bahar, Painter
 Mohamed Bourouissa, Artist
 Frantz Fanon, Artist
 Dahmane Ben Achour, Singer
 Rachid Nouni, Singer
 Abdelkader Guessoum, Singer
 Mohamed Tobal, Singer
 Mohamed Sidi el Kebir, Singer
 Kamel Choumane, Singer

Notes

References

 Alice Cherki and Nadia Benabid (2006) Frantz Fanon: A Portrait, Cornell University Press, 255 pages  
 C. Michael Hogan, (2008) Barbary Macaque: Macaca sylvanus, Globaltwitcher.com, ed. Nicklas Stromberg

 
Communes of Blida Province
Province seats of Algeria
Populated places established in the 16th century